The Saxon Class III b were German steam locomotives built for the Royal Saxon State Railways (Königlich Sächsische Staatseisenbahnen) in the late 19th century as tender locomotives for express train duties. In 1925, the Deutsche Reichsbahn incorporated the engines into DRG Class 34.77-78.

Between 1873 and 1901, a total of 204 locomotives were delivered to the Royal Saxon State Railways by the firms of  Hartmann, Henschel and Schwartzkopff. During the course of their manufacture there were continual modifications. Eighteen were built as compound engines.

The Reichsbahn took over 91 machines and gave them the running numbers 34 7701, 34 7702, 34 7721–34 7808.

Rebuild of the Saxon Class III
Later, 14 engines of the Saxon Class III were equipped with  Nowotny steerable axles and also classified as Saxon IIIb locomotives. Of fourteen such engines, only one entered the Deutsche Reichsbahn where it was given the running number 52 7001.

The locomotives equipped with Saxon sä 3 T 7.5 und sä 3 T 9 tenders.

References

See also
Royal Saxon State Railways
List of Saxon locomotives and railbuses

2-4-0 locomotives
03 b
Esslingen locomotives
Berliner locomotives
Henschel locomotives
Sächsische Maschinenfabrik locomotives
Railway locomotives introduced in 1873
1B n2 locomotives
Passenger locomotives